Hongwei District is a district of Liaoyang City, Liaoning province, People's Republic of China.

Administrative Divisions
There are four subdistricts and one town within the district.

Subdistricts:
Changzheng Subdistrict, Xincun Subdistrict, Gongnong Subdistrict, Guanghua Subdistrict

The only town is Shuguang

References

External links

County-level divisions of Liaoning
Liaoyang